Fowle is a surname, and may refer to:

 Bruce Fowle, American architect
 Carrie Farnsworth Fowle (1854–1917), American missionary
 Daniel Fowle (printer)  (c. 1715–1787), American printer
 Daniel Gould Fowle (1831–1891), governor of North Carolina
 Helen Whitaker Fowle (1869–1948), First Lady of North Carolina
 E Percy Fowle
 Steven Fowle, newspaper proprietor
 Susannah Fowle (born 1958), Australian actress
 Thomas Fowle (c. 1530 – after 1597), English clergyman
 Zechariah Fowle (printer), American printer